Raimi Ayo Hassan (born 12 August 1984 at Lagos, Nigeria) is a Nigerian footballer who is currently with Kuala Lumpur FA.

A defender, Ayo Hassan Raimi played for several clubs including Kaduna United F.C., Al-Ittihad (Bahrain), Al-Ahli Saida, Tuen Mun Progoal FC and Kuan Tai in Macau.

In December 2011, Hassan signed a six-month contract with Kuala Lumpur FA in the Malaysia Super League However, following the close of the pre-season transfer window on December 8, 2011, KL were left with an all-local line up after a FA employee bungled Hassan's transfer to Kuala Lumpur. He plays as a defender for Khoromkhon in the Niislel League Mongolia

References

1984 births
Living people
Nigerian footballers
Nigerian expatriate footballers
Expatriate footballers in Bahrain
Expatriate footballers in Malaysia
Kuala Lumpur City F.C. players
Expatriate footballers in Mongolia
Khoromkhon players
Association football defenders

ar:هيلاري ماكاسا